Suresh Singh Rawat is an Indian politician and a member of the Rajasthan Legislative Assembly representing the Pushkar Assembly constituency of Rajasthan. He is a member of the Bharatiya Janata Party (BJP).

Early life 
Suresh Singh Rawat hails from Ajmer of Rajasthan's Muhami region. He has done Bachelor of Arts Honours degree from Maharshi Dayanand Saraswati University.

Political career
Since March 2013, he is a Member of Rajasthan Legislative Assembly as BJP MLA from Pushkar 

He is the Parliamentary secretary, State Minister in Government of Rajasthan

On 19 September 2022 he brought a cow to the state assembly to protest about the Lumpy disease.

Other works
He played the role of Raja in Pehredaar Piya Ki in Indian television show at Sony Entertainment Television.

References

External links
 

Living people
Bharatiya Janata Party politicians from Rajasthan
Rajasthan MLAs 2013–2018
Rajasthan MLAs 2018–2023
Year of birth missing (living people)